The 1935 United Kingdom general election in Northern Ireland was held on 14 November as part of the wider general election. There were ten constituencies, seven single-seat constituencies with elected by FPTP and three two-seat constituencies with MPs elected by bloc voting.

Results
This election saw no change in the distribution of seats from Northern Ireland.

In the election as a whole, a second National Government which had been formed before the election was returned with Stanley Baldwin of the Conservative Party as Prime Minister. The Ulster Unionists were members of the Conservative Party. Also in the government were the National Liberal Party and National Labour.

MPs elected

By-elections

Footnote

References

Northern Ireland
1935
1935 elections in Northern Ireland
November 1935 events